Monster Truck Rally is an off-road racing video game developed by Realtime Associates for the Nintendo Entertainment System (NES), and published by INTV Corp. in 1991.

Gameplay
In the game, monster trucks rally on long dirt tracks; compete in special events such as automotive tug of war and sled-pulling; and perform maneuvers such as driving in doughnuts and crushing stationary cars. In Track Builder mode, players can design their own special stage to drive on.

Monster Truck Rally is one of a minority of NES software titles to support the NES Four Score and NES Satellite video game accessories, allowing up to four players to compete in the game.

This Box cover from 1991 features an illustration by Marc Ericksen.

See also
R.C. Pro-Am (1988)
Ivan "Ironman" Stewart's Super Off Road (1989)

References

1991 video games
Off-road racing video games
Monster truck video games
Nintendo Entertainment System games
Nintendo Entertainment System-only games
North America-exclusive video games
Multiplayer and single-player video games
Video games scored by George Sanger
Video games developed in the United States